Rachel Eileen Reilly Villegas (born October 16, 1984) is an American television personality, fashion designer, talk show host, actress, and reality show winner. Reilly appeared in two seasons of the U.S. edition of the reality TV series Big Brother, winning season 13 in 2011. She has also participated in two seasons of The Amazing Race with her husband Brendon Villegas, placing third both occasions. She participated in a third season with her sister Elissa Slater, placing seventh. She has also won Celebrity Fear Factor and Snake in the Grass.

Early life
Reilly, with one younger sister named Elissa, was born in Concord, North Carolina and attended First Assembly Christian School in Concord.  She graduated from Northwest Cabarrus High School in Kannapolis, North Carolina in 2002. Reilly is a member of the Phi Mu sorority and she graduated from Western Carolina University in Cullowhee, North Carolina with a bachelor's degree in chemistry in 2007.

Reality television

Big Brother

Season 12
Reilly first appeared on Big Brother in its twelfth season, aired in the Summer of 2010. Within the first week of the season, Reilly entered into a romantic relationship with fellow houseguest Brendon Villegas, leading to the pair becoming immediate targets. Despite being nominated in the first week, Reilly was spared when the rest of the house decided fellow nominee Annie Whittington was a bigger threat. Reilly won two Head of Household competitions during her stay in the house, in the second and fourth weeks, resulting in the evictions of Monet Stunson and Kristen Bitting. Reilly was known for her many feuds during her stay, most notably with Ragan Fox and Britney Haynes. Eventually, Reilly and Villegas were nominated together in the fifth week of the season. Despite Villegas' attempts to get the other players to keep Reilly instead of him, Reilly was evicted unanimously. Reilly later returned to the house as a guest for one day as part of the "Pandora's Box" twist. As a result of her ninth place finish, Reilly became the first member of the Big Brother jury, and eventually voted for runner-up Lane Elenburg to win the $500,000 prize.

Season 13
One year later, Reilly and Villegas (by now her fiancé) returned to Big Brother for its thirteenth season, as part of a "Returning Duos" twist. Reilly claimed she was returning to the show in a bid to redeem herself following her previous appearance. Reilly and Villegas quickly forged an alliance with the four other returning players, father and daughter, Dick and Daniele Donato of Big Brother 8 and fellow couple, Jordan Lloyd and Jeff Schroeder of Big Brother 11, as well as a side alliance with Porsche Briggs. The alliance, known as "the Veterans," dominated the house in the early weeks, with Reilly winning Head of Household (HoH) in the first and third weeks, as well as the Power of Veto in a two-person challenge with Villegas in the first week. The alliance fell apart in the second of Reilly's HoH weeks, when Daniele was caught in her attempts to turn the two couples against each other. However, Daniele then proceeded to win the next HoH competition, nominating Reilly and Villegas against each other, sparking a long-running feud between the two women. After winning the Power of Veto, Villegas decided to use it on Reilly, effectively ensuring his own eviction. Reilly was nominated again the following week, but was spared when confusion about an upcoming twist caused Lawon Exum to volunteer to be evicted in her place, in the mistaken belief that it would give him an advantage in the game. In reality, the evicted player and the winner of an America's Choice vote would compete to return, with Villegas winning the vote and then beating Exum in the subsequent competition, regaining his place in the game. His stay was short lived however, as he was evicted at the hands of Donato once again a week later. Reilly took revenge the following week, evicting Daniele after finding herself as the swing-vote. After narrowly surviving an eviction vote 3-2 against Schroeder, Reilly paired with Lloyd when the duos twist briefly returned, and won a key Veto competition that kept them both in the game at the expense of Shelly Moore. Reilly then followed up by winning HoH for the third time, resulting in the eviction of Kalia Booker. After failing to win the final Veto competition, Reilly reformed her early alliance with Briggs, and the pair worked together to make the final two, with Briggs evicting Lloyd in the final four stage, and then Reilly evicting Adam Poch the following week after she won HoH for the fourth time. Reilly eventually was named as the winner of Big Brother 13 in a vote of 4-3 over Briggs, earning the jury votes of Brendon Villegas, Jeff Schroeder, Jordan Lloyd and Shelly Moore, and losing the votes of Daniele Donato, Kalia Booker and Adam Poch. Reilly won $500,000 for winning the show.

Other seasons
Reilly briefly returned to the house during Big Brother 14 as a Pandora's Box "prize" for Ian Terry. She then made a brief appearance in the premiere episode of Big Brother 15, giving her sister Elissa a key to the Big Brother house. She also appeared later in the season, offering her opinion on the season and her sister's gameplay. She appeared in a similar role during the closing stages of the second season of Big Brother Canada and Big Brother 16, discussing the game and prospects of the remaining HouseGuests. In Big Brother 20, she returned to the house to host a Power of Veto competition.

Records
In being nominated for eviction five times
 and still making it to the end to win the $500,000 prize. Additionally, in winning the third part of the final Head of Household competition (which she won by providing the only correct answers), she tied Janelle Pierzina's record of multi-seasonal HoH competition wins at six. She is also tied with Drew Daniel, Pierzina, Hayden Moss, Ian Terry, Aaryn Gries and Caleb Reynolds for the most sole HOHs won in a season at four.

Post-Big Brother
The day following her Big Brother win, Reilly and Villegas appeared on CBS talk-show The Talk, co-hosted by Big Brother hostess Julie Chen. Reilly discussed her experiences on Big Brother during her appearance and won a vacation to Aruba, after competing in a Big Brother style challenge. In late 2011, photographs appeared on the internet suggesting that Reilly and Villegas are competing as a team on season 20 of The Amazing Race. In January 2012, CBS confirmed that Reilly and Villegas would compete on season 20 of The Amazing Race. In 2013, Reilly began appearing in a Hollywood production of The Real Drunk Housewives of San Fernando Valley, a musical parody of the television show. Reilly is currently a fashion designer and TV Producer and Casting Agent.

The Amazing Race 20
Reilly and then-fiancé Brendon Villegas were on the season 20 of The Amazing Race, which premiered on February 19, 2012. They ended up in 3rd place out of 11 teams in the final leg, losing to border patrol agents of Art Velez and J.J. Carrell (runners-up) and the married couple Rachel and Dave Brown, Jr. (winners). During the competition, Reilly was shown breaking down into tears several times, and also got into arguments with competitor Vanessa Macias.

The Amazing Race 24
After their marriage, Reilly and Villegas participated in The Amazing Race once more as part of its second All-Stars edition. Through the course of the season, the two won three legs, earning  each and a trip to the Great Barrier Reef. However, they again finished the race in 3rd place. Reilly and Villegas are the first team to have completed all legs of the race on two separate seasons, with Reilly being the first woman competitor to complete this task (Eric Sanchez of seasons 9 and 11 had accomplished this earlier as the first male racer, but he had a new race teammate for his second season).

The Amazing Race 31
Reilly participated for the third time of her career. This time, Reilly raced with her sister, Elissa Slater. They finished in 7th place. She also broke the all-time record for most legs raced ever on The Amazing Race during this season, which was later broken by Leo and Jamal. She still holds the female record for the most legs raced.

Celebrity Fear Factor
Reilly and her husband Brendon Villegas participated in the episode titled Royalty Rumble. Reilly and her husband climbed through cockroaches, snakes, frogs, crabs and maggots to complete a puzzle. They were immersed in a giant water tank upside down by their ankles to test their fear of drowning and how long they could handle the task. Finally, they completed the stunt of landing a helicopter on a moving 18-wheeler, disarming a bomb, and escaping before the truck blew up. Reilly and Villegas had the quickest time and won $50,000 for lung cancer charity.

Snake in the Grass
Reilly competed against fellow Big Brother and The Amazing Race alum Janelle Pierzina and former Survivor contestants Cirie Fields and Stephenie Lagrossa Kendrick for a chance to win $100,000. At the end of the episode, she, Pierzina, and Fields figured out that LaGrossa Kendrick was the Snake and the three of them split the grand prize money.

The Traitors
In 2023, Reilly competed on Peacock's reality TV series The Traitors alongside her fellow Snake in the Grass contestants Cirie Fields and Stephenie LaGrossa Kendrick.

Other television
Reilly has played a recurring role as a waitress on CBS's Emmy Award-winning soap opera The Bold and the Beautiful since 2010. She also landed a gig on Hollywood Today Live on FOX as their reality TV correspondent and the reality TV expert for the show.

Reilly's wedding aired on WeTV to spouse Brendon Villegas, planned by celebrity wedding planner David Tutera.

Personal life
Reilly is married to fellow Big Brother player Brendon Villegas. Villegas proposed on Valentine's Day 2011, and they married September 8, 2012. WE Network aired Reilly and Villegas's wedding as a holiday wedding special. Celebrity event coordinator David Tutera planned the gala, which took place at sunset in the city of Los Angeles. The wedding was attended by approximately 120 friends and family. The couple honeymooned in Aruba. On September 16, 2015, Reilly and Villegas announced that she was pregnant with their first child together. On April 8, 2016, their child was born, a girl named Adora Borealis Villegas. On May 10, 2020, Reilly and Villegas announced that she was pregnant with their second child together. On November 11, 2020, their child was born, a boy named Adler Mateo Villegas.

Filmography

References

External links

21st-century American actresses
Actresses from North Carolina
American soap opera actresses
Big Brother (American TV series) winners
Living people
People from Concord, North Carolina
The Amazing Race (American TV series) contestants
Western Carolina University alumni
1984 births